Seven Days (also written as 7 Days) is an American science fiction television series based on the premise of time travel. It was created by Christopher and Zachary Crowe, and aired on UPN from October 7, 1998 to May 29, 2001.

Synopsis
The plot follows a secret branch of the US National Security Agency, which has developed a time travelling device based upon alien technology found at Roswell. As the opening of the show recounts, the Chronosphere, or Backstep Sphere, is capable of sending “one human being back in time seven days” to avert disasters. The show's title refers to the chief limitation of the technology, namely that a traveler can only backstep seven days due to limitations imposed by the device's fuel source and its reactor. As the fuel source is limited, there is a strict mandate that the backstep is confined to events relating directly to national security. The backstep team and the equipment are stationed in a base in a secret location somewhere in the desert of Nevada called Never Never Land—a play on Area 51, or Groom Lake Flight Test Facilities, also known as Dreamland.

The first episode begins with an attack on the White House, after which "Project Backstep" receives permission to attempt a launch. Under pressure to identify the perpetrators and find the exact sequence of events leading to the attack, the team coordinates with branches of the CIA, US Military, and sympathetic world powers to plan a response while the scientific team attempts to finish the technology. They search for a test pilot, eventually selecting Frank Parker, a former Navy SEAL and CIA operative whose son died in the aftermath of the attack, to be the world's first "Chrononaut." After succeeding in both time travel and in preventing the attack (thus reversing the deaths of his family), Parker chooses to stay with the program.

Cast
 U.S. Navy Commander Francis "Frank" Bartholomew Parker (Jonathan LaPaglia), a former Navy SEAL and ex-CIA operative recruited by the program to be the project's "chrononaut". While having served with distinction, he is not the program's initial choice due to a history of emotional instability stemming from an extended period of torture while being held prisoner in Somalia; however, Donovan vouches for Frank, and facilitates his release from a secret mental health facility for troubled operatives with classified knowledge. Frank's testing reveals that in addition to the determination and physical stamina necessary to succeed as a Navy SEAL, he has an exceptionally high pain tolerance, a photographic memory, and a capacity for unorthodox problem-solving. In addition to his military service, several plot elements focus on his troubled youth in Philadelphia, his attempts to reconcile relationships with his ex-wife and estranged son, and his attempts to use time travel for personal gain. The latter is often played for comedic effect as a series of running gags where his future knowledge of sports betting is rendered defunct due to changes in the timeline, and his romantic pursuit of Dr. Vukavitch succeed only to be undone when he travels through time.  Throughout the series, he also clashes with the project's head of security, Nathan Ramsey, due to the restrictive nature of his service with the program. His codename in the field is "Conundrum."
 Dr. Olga Vukavitch (Justina Vail), a Russian doctor who worked in the Russian version of the Backstep Project, which, without any technology from the Roswell crash, never reached operational level. She lost her husband in an accident. She grows to like Frank (whom she addresses formally) at times, but is almost invariably put off by some new show of his crassness or arrogance (although Frank often manages to overcome this, only to have to Backstep). Despite this, many episodes reveal that she has a hidden affection for Frank, and she always thinks of him shortly before she dies in a previous timeline.
 U.S. Navy Captain Craig Donovan (Don Franklin), Navy SEAL and Project Backstep's military advisor/tactical coordinator and backup chrononaut. He is an old friend of Frank's from the SEAL teams, who led the operation to rescue him in Mogadishu. As a Chrononaut candidate, Donovan was an early lead during the testing phase, due to his excellent hand-eye coordination, physical conditioning, and psychological stability. Compared with Frank, the scientists believed that Donovan would be the better overall pilot for the chronosphere, and that his coordination would ensure less risk to the equipment; however, Talmadge eventually selects Frank due to the advantages of his pain tolerance and photographic memory, though Donovan never begrudges this and is Frank's strongest supporter. In spite of his 'backup' status, the series never depicts him taking Frank's place. He has, on occasion, assumed command of the project, its security forces, and the scientific branch during the end-of-the world situations that frequently precede a backstep as project leaders were killed or incapacitated. He is well-liked and respected by the scientific, security, and military staff and was Ramsey's preferred choice.
 Dr. Bradley Talmadge (Alan Scarfe), director of the Backstep Project operations and a long-time member of the NSA intelligence community. Although middle-aged, he is shown several times to still have excellent combat skills.
 NSA Agent Nathan Ramsey (Nick Searcy), Backstep Project security chief. A short-tempered, highly opinionated man, he opposes Frank becoming chrononaut and is therefore made the prime target of Parker's practical jokes. Ramsey is portrayed to be conservative, and he always makes politically incorrect statements supporting the use of force to quickly end problems (but the way he puts it is always funny instead of malicious).  Ramsey's area of expertise is intelligence and counter-intelligence.  His job is to use the information that Frank Parker gives him to avert disasters, but Frank commonly fulfills the missions himself.  Ramsey is also the man the NSA sends out to retrieve Frank when the Ex-Seal makes unscheduled disappearances from the base.
 Dr. Isaac Mentnor (Norman Lloyd) (seasons 1–2, guest appearances in season 3), a scientist with a shadowy past that's tied into the Roswell cover-up, Dr. Mentnor was the man who initially conceived the Backstep project.
 Dr. John Ballard (Sam Whipple) (seasons 1–2). The wheelchair-using resident genius on the Backstep Project. Ballard is responsible for calibrating and maintaining the Spheres and keeping them active to allow for a quick Backstep if needed. In the fourth episode of season 3, he won a tropical island in a poker match in Las Vegas and married two girls, but he's not sure whom, since he was a little drunk at the time. So he took some time off to straighten things out.
 Andrew "Hooter" Owsley (Kevin Christy) (season 3). A young physics prodigy whom Ballard suggested as his replacement. He works with Dr. Mentnor to enhance the existing Backstep technology and has been shown occasionally to have a secret crush on Olga.
 Carrie Quigley (Anne Marie Loder) (season 3).

Production
Three seasons of Seven Days were produced. All three seasons have been shown in North America, and by the BBC in the United Kingdom.

Seven Days was based on an idea from Kerry McCluggage, then-president of Paramount Television. He pitched the idea to Christopher Crowe, who mixed it with his own research on Area 51 to create the series. The show wasn't a hit with reviewers, who criticized the show's "flimsy" premise and violence.

Original cast member Sam Whipple, who played Dr. John Ballard, left the series four episodes into the third season, due to diagnosis of a cancer that was eventually fatal. He was replaced by Kevin Christy as young physics prodigy Andrew "Hooter" Owsley for the rest of the season.

Justina Vail, who played Dr. Olga Vukavitch, quit the series before the end of the third season, though she agreed to film a few extra scenes to wrap-up her character's arc. Her departure and the tensions within the cast, as well as the show's low ratings, played a role in UPN's decision to not renew the series for a fourth season.

Episodes

DVD release
On November 26, 2018, Visual Entertainment released the complete series on DVD in Region 1 for the first time.

Awards
Seven Days was nominated for six awards, winning one. Actress Justina Vail won a Saturn Award in 2000 for her performance on the show.

References

External links

 

1998 American television series debuts
2001 American television series endings
American time travel television series
1990s American science fiction television series
2000s American science fiction television series
2000s American time travel television series
UPN original programming
Saturn Award-winning television series
Television series by CBS Studios
Television series created by Christopher Crowe (screenwriter)
Television shows set in Nevada
Television shows filmed in Vancouver
Television series set in the future
1990s American time travel television series